F.C. Għarb Rangers is a football club from the village of Għarb, on the island of Gozo (Malta). The club was founded in 1968.

They currently play in the Second Division of Gozo Football League, that they won once in 2017.

History
In 1968 a football team was established in Għarb with the name of Għarb Rangers. They took part to the Gozitan championship for two seasons, 1968–69 and 1969–70, with a team formed by local players. Then the team was inactive for 15 years.

In 1985, thanks to an agreement with the neighbour town of San Lawrenz, a team named Għarb St. Lawrence Rangers was made up to participate in the Gozitan league 1985-86, organized in a single division with eleven teams. Their record that year was 0-1-9.

Since the following season, St. Lawrence Spurs F.C. and Għarb Rangers are two independent football clubs.

Recent seasons
After winning the Second Division of Gozo Football League in 2017, the Rangers competed in the First Division for three years until 2020.

Għarb Rangers competed in Maltese FA Trophy six times. In 2011–12, 2012–13 and 2015–16 they lost the first round, while in 2016–17 they lost the first round after defeating 2-1 the Maltese team Xghajra Tornadoes in the preliminary round. In 2018–19 Rangers lost the second round after defeating Xghajra Tornadoes 2-1 again in the first round. In 2019–20, their last appearance in the competition, Rangers lost the first round 2-0 vs. Gozitan team Xewkija Tigers.

Honours
GFL Second Division Knock-Out
Champions (2): 1999–2000, 2015–16
GFL Second Division
Champions (1): 2016–17

Current squad

References

External links
Għarb Rangers on Facebook
Season 2022–23

Football clubs in Malta
Gozitan football clubs
Association football clubs established in 1968
1968 establishments in Malta
Għarb